SSV Robert C. Seamans is a 134-foot steel sailing brigantine operated by the Sea Education Association (SEA) for oceanographic research and sail training; designed by Laurent Giles, she is named for former Secretary of the Air Force and NASA Deputy Administrator, Robert Channing Seamans, a former Chairman and Trustee of SEA's board. She is equipped with hydrographic winches, bathymetric equipment, biological and geological sampling equipment, a wet/dry laboratory, and a computer laboratory. She has a sister ship, the Corwith Cramer.

The Robert C. Seamans runs an undergraduate academic study abroad program, with intensive research in oceanography, maritime studies, and nautical science with hands-on experience aboard a traditional sailing ship.

She is based in the Pacific Ocean and typically sails between San Diego, California; Honolulu, Hawaii;  Tahiti; and San Francisco, California with occasional trips to New Zealand.

She is powered by a 3408 Caterpillar (455 HP) Marine Diesel Engine and two 40 kW Northern Lights Generators that provide 3 phase power.

See also
 SSV Corwith Cramer
 Nautical terms
 Rigging
 Robert Seamans
 Tall ship
 Woods Hole

External links
 
 Sea Education Association
 Robert C. Seamans Technical Info
 Biography of Robert C. Seamans, Jr.

2001 ships
Boats designed by Laurent Giles
Brigantines
Individual sailing vessels
Tall ships of the United States
Training ships of the United States
Sail training ships